Fiona Swarovski (born January 21, 1965 as Fiona Winter) is an Austrian-Italian-Swiss entrepreneur, fashion designer and personal stylist.

Biography
Fiona Swarovski was born in Basel. She descends on her mother’s side from Swarovski Group founder Daniel Swarovski. She works as the director of Fiona Winter Studio (FWS) in Milan, Italy. Her company is currently working with Antolini Luigi & C. of Italy on a project that will combine different exotic stone materials with Swarovski crystal patterns. 

Fiona Swarovski is an heir to her family business, Swarovski Crystal, a jewelry and fashion accessories enterprise located in Innsbruck, the capital city of Tyrol in western Austria. She is married to Austrian politician and finance minister Karl-Heinz Grasser. On October 27, 2006, she and Grasser were rescued from a kidnapping plot that demanded the payment of an undisclosed amount of money as a ransom for their release.

References

Austrian fashion designers
Austrian women fashion designers
Italian fashion designers
Italian women fashion designers
Swiss fashion designers
Swiss women fashion designers
1965 births
Living people